Orakzai District is a district in Kohat Division of Khyber Pakhtunkhwa province in Pakistan. Until 2018, it was an agency of Federally Administered Tribal Areas. With the merger of FATA with Khyber Pakhtunkhwa, it became a district. Before to 1973, it was part of FR Kohat.

History
The Orakzai tribes take their name, which literally means "the lost son" (Wrak Dzoy), from a romantic legend about their ancestor, Sikandar Shah, who was a prince from Iran, was exiled or lost, and after many adventures, married and ruled in Tirah. The tribal area now forming Orakzai Agency was previously included in Frontier Region Kohat district and remained as such until 30 November 1973.

The Biland Khel or Boland Khel, a small pocket of about 6.5 square kilometres, is part of this agency and is two kilometres off Thall, bordering North Waziristan and Kurram agencies. Responding to a long-standing demand of the Orakzais, the then President of Pakistan announced the creation of Orakzai Agency on 3 November 1973 and was formally inaugurated on 1 December 1973. Before it was upgraded to agency status, this area was administered as a Frontier Region of the Kohat district by the Deputy Commissioner of Kohat.

The Orakzai Agency consists of two sub-divisions: Upper sub-division and Lower sub-division. The Upper sub-division comprises two Tehsils, Upper Tehsil and Ismailzai Tehsil, and the Lower sub-division also has two Tehsils, Lower Tehsil and Central Tehsil. The land of the Orakzai tribes is between 33° -33' to 33° -54' north latitudes and 70° -36' to 71° -22' east longitudes. It is bounded in the north by Khyber Agency, in the east by FR Kohat, in the south by Kohat and Hangu districts, and in the west by Kurram Agency. The total area of the agency is 1,538 square kilometres.

Certain Orakzai tribes like the Masozai and half the Lashkarzai find themselves in Kurram Agency for historical and administrative reasons. An ethnic Pashtun Bangash tribe, the Buland Khel or Beland Khil, is attached to the Orakzai agency also for administrative and historical reasons, although they live some distance from the agency between Thall and Bannu, North Waziristan.

Then Prime Minister Zulfiqar Ali Bhutto announced the creation of the agency at a grand tribal jirga at Samana, and it began functioning on 1 December 1973. Before this, the Orakzai tribes were part of the Kohat and Hangu Frontier region. The headquarters of the agency are at Hangu District, but tehsil-level headquarters are in Kalaya and Ghiljo Bazar.

Geography
Among the seven tribal agencies, Orakzai Agency is the second smallest in area after Bajaur Agency. It is bounded by Kurram Agency in the west, Khyber in the north, Kohat District on the south and Peshawar in the east. The whole of the territory of Orakzai agency is a mountainous tract dissected by numerous dry water courses, especially in the southwest part of the agency. The two major streams are the Mastura River and Khanki Toi River, both of which originate from the hills to west and run eastwards.

Orakzai Agency is a hilly region with a fertile valley. Important peaks are Sangla (6325 ft) and Chara Kandaco (5643 ft). The height of Kalaya and Sangla is nearly equal.

Orakzai Agency is characterized by intensely cold winters and mild summers. December, January and February are the coldest months and snow falls in these months. Summers are mild and the maximum temperature does not go above 30 degrees Celsius. Surrounding mountains are covered by dense thick forests, which produce a cooling effect in summer. Due to the geographical position of Orakzai and its thick forest cover, it rains throughout the year. In winter, the precipitation is snowfall over the surrounding mountains and the valley.

Demographics 

At the time of the 2017 census the district had a population of 254,303, of which 127,564 were males and 126,728 females. The entire population was rural. The literacy rate was 37.43% - the male literacy rate was 60.63% while the female literacy rate was 15.02%. 176 people in the district were from religious minorities. Pashto was the predominant language, spoken by 99.59% of the population.

Tourism

Nanawar cave is located in Mani Khel Dara Orakzai Tribal District. It is approx 200 Meters long cave with 2 entrances, and is home to thousands of bats & spiders. The cave traces its history back thousands of years with varying opinions and myths:-

•Thousands of years back, lava erupted here and it seems like a bubble trapped in lava which made this cave.

•Second opinion is that it is a lime stone cave which ended up on water channel beneath the surface in summer water.

•Other opinion of the historian is that the graves on the ground in the general area are not Muslim graves, and it is believed that this cave was used for meditation in Kanishka times 127 CE.

•The myth that its farther end is unexplored, seems false. It has a farther end with a graduated narrowing/ suffocating effects due to low oxygen.

History of Nanawar Cave compiled by Zakir Ullah Khan.

Administration

Orakzai District is currently subdivided into four Tehsils.

 Central Orakzai Tehsil
 Ismail Zai Tehsil
 Lower Orakzai Tehsil
 Upper Orakzai Tehsil

Upper Orakzai
Upper Orakzai is a National Assembly constituency in the Orakzai District.

Some of main areas of Upper Orakzai include:
 Ghiljo Bazar
 Dabori
 Sama Bazar 
 Ghotak Eisa khel 
 Mishti mela
Upper Orakzai is the Sub-Division of Orakzai District.
The main office are in Ghiljo Bazar.
Upper Orakzai includes four big sections:
Ali khel 
Mola Khel
Mamozai 
Ali Sherzai
Eisa khel
Ahkhel
Shikhan

Lower Orakzai
Lower Orakzai agency is subdivision. Headquarter is in kalaya town named Kalaya Headquarter, a populated area of Orakzai agency. The main sections are 
Sepoy, Bar Muhammad khel, Mani khel ,  Feroz khel,utman khel, Bezoti and Stori Khel

Provincial Assembly

Education 
According to Pakistan District Education Rankings 2017 published by Alif Ailaan, Orakzai District ranks 125th in Pakistan in terms of primary school infrastructure while it ranks 132nd in Pakistan for middle school infrastructure.

In terms of education score, Orakzai District stands at 103rd number in National Ranking. The retention score is 30.03 whereas the gender parity score is 63.14 from the available data.

Lack of government schools and provision of teachers are among the main issues reported by the residents of Orakzai District using the Taleem Do! App.

Culture
Culture of the area is dominantly Pashtun, with people adhering strongly to the Pashtun code of conduct also known as "Pakhto or Pashtunwali". Religion is evident in their lifestyle. People are very much social and maintain Hujra culture. Hujra is a community centre, guest house, meeting place, court and shelter. People adhere strongly to the jirga system for peace and justice where saying of the respectable elders is observed.

Talibanization and Army offensive
Talibanization of the area started back in 2006 when sectarian violence was at a peak. In the beginning, the Taliban were welcome because no one knew their real intentions, they intermingled with the locals in the start and when they were in sufficient numbers, they started to dictate to the people. The local people found themselves helpless and were forced to obey. There are many incidents to cite. In Kalaya village, August 2013, an incident happened. The Taliban attacked and kidnapped 230 Orakzai people. Some of the old, young men, women and children were arrested. Taliban tortured a lot and martyred 80 innocent people. After one week the remaining people founded the Pakistan army's operation against Talibans. So many people were injured. Taliban destroyed whole Kalaya village and Orakzai's business. People migrated to different places and different countries to save their lives. After a humiliating defeat in Waziristan, the Taliban fled to Orakzai Agency. Very soon the area witnessed intense violence and the Army started an unannounced offensive (Orakzai and Kurram offensive). The army cut them in the west from the Kurram Agency, in the south from Kohat and in the east from Bara and started an attack. Locals supported the army to their capacity and soon they were forced to flee and evacuate the lower subdivision. Heavy damages were inflicted upon them in the upper subdivision also and their influence in the area reduced very much. This resulted in the mass evacuation of the IDPs towards Kohat and Hangu where they were given shelter in camps. The situation has defused greatly in Lower Orakzai division, but an army operation against Taliban militants continues in Central and Upper sub-divisions.

Lower Orakzai Agency.
Village Kalaya.
It is a small village in the centre of Lower Orakzai Agency. People say it the Heart of Orakzai. A small village ″Terai″ situated in lower Orakzai agency consider to be the first and ancestor of Orakzai people.

See also
Wachpal
Orakzai Scouts

References

 
Districts of Khyber Pakhtunkhwa